Ortica is a district (quartiere) of Milan, Italy, located within the Zone 3 administrative division. The district used to be a frazione of Lambrate when the latter was an autonomous comune; after Lambrate was annexed to Milan, in 1923, Lambrate and Ortica came to be referred to as distinct districts.

The name Ortica comes from orto, referring to a small market garden, as the river Lambro, traversing both Lambrate and Ortica, has been long used for the irrigation of small cultivated areas.

Ortica housed a railway station, called Stazione di Lambrate, from 1896 to 1931; the station was later moved to another location in Lambrate proper (now Lambrate district).

Enzo Jannacci, the famous Milanese singer-songwriter, mentions Ortica in his song Faceva il palo ("he was the lookout"), dedicated to some "Gang of the Ortica" (banda dell'Ortica).

Districts of Milan